The discography of Big Pun contains two studio albums, one compilation album and 19 singles (including 13 as featured artist).

Albums

Studio albums

Compilation albums

Singles

Solo

As featured performer

Guest Appearances

References

External links 

Hip hop discographies
Discographies of American artists